Dylan Emanuel Glaby (born 7 April 1996) is an Argentine professional footballer who plays as an midfielder for Chilean club Coquimbo Unido.

Club career
As a child, Glaby was with club Carlos Casares from Rafael Castillo and switched to Boca Juniors in 2006. After he had brief stints with Vélez Sarsfield and the Uruguayan side Juventud Las Piedras in 2016.

From 2017 to 2019, he played for the Primera D clubs Real Pilar and Argentino de Merlo, winning the league title in 2018–19.

After a stint with Deportivo Morón (2019–21), he joined Barracas Central on loan, getting the promotion to the Argentine Primera División in 2021.

In 2023, he signed with Chilean Primera División side Coquimbo Unido.

Honours
Argentino de Merlo
 Primera D:

References

External links
 
 

1996 births
Living people
Sportspeople from Buenos Aires Province
Argentine footballers
Association football midfielders
Argentine expatriate footballers
Uruguayan Primera División players
Juventud de Las Piedras players
Primera D Metropolitana players
Real Pilar Fútbol Club players
Argentino de Merlo footballers
Primera Nacional players
Argentine Primera División players
Deportivo Morón footballers
Barracas Central players
Chilean Primera División players
Coquimbo Unido footballers
Expatriate footballers in Uruguay
Argentine expatriate sportspeople in Uruguay
Expatriate footballers in Chile
Argentine expatriate sportspeople in Chile